Patzicía is a town, with a population of 21,249 (2018 census), and a municipality in the Chimaltenango department of Guatemala.

References 

Municipalities of the Chimaltenango Department